Višňové is a village and municipality in Žilina District in the Žilina Region of northern Slovakia.

History
In historical records the village was first mentioned in 1393.

Geography
The municipality lies at an altitude of 450 metres and covers an area of 15.170 km2. It has a population of about 2 797 people.

References

External links
https://web.archive.org/web/20071116010355/http://www.statistics.sk/mosmis/eng/run.html

Villages and municipalities in Žilina District